The 1920 Valparaiso University football team represented Valparaiso University in the 1920 college football season. In George Keogan's second year as head coach, the Crusaders compiled a 5–3 record and outscored their opponents 215 to 60.  Notable games included losses to Harvard and Notre Dame, who were each recognized as national champions, Harvard by Boand and Notre Dame by Billingsley and Parke H. Davis.

Schedule

References

1920 college football season
1920
1920 in sports in Indiana